Marton is a village in the Harrogate district of North Yorkshire, England. The village is joined with Grafton and it forms the civil parish of Marton cum Grafton.

Village pub

The village public house is called  Ye Olde Punch Bowl Inn, a sixteenth-century inn which still contains a number of original features.  The lease was part owned by Neil Morrissey until the business went into liquidation on 22 October 2009. The original experience of buying the lease and setting up the pub/microbrewery were turned into a TV programme Neil Morrissey's Risky Business which aired late 2008 on Channel 4.

History
There is an active village history group which is engaged in a number of activities as detailed on its website.

In 2007 a Roman lead coffin burial was discovered very close to the village,  which was widely reported in the local and national press: the village history group intend to use the location of this burial as the starting point for an extended search for the Roman villa which they believe is certainly associated with it.

The village school was founded in 1861.

References

External links

Villages in North Yorkshire
Borough of Harrogate